Dickie Arbiter LVO (born September 1940) is a British journalist, television and radio commentator on the British royal family and an international public speaker. He was a press spokesman for Queen Elizabeth II from 1988 until 2000; in the 1996 Birthday Honours, he was appointed Lieutenant of the Royal Victorian Order (LVO).

Biography

Arbiter was born during an air raid on London, to German Jewish refugee parents.
After college in London, he was an actor and stage manager in South Africa and the Federation of Rhodesia and Nyasaland, where he became a television and radio news reporter. His most famous Rhodesia Television on-air slip up occurred when he started a radio broadcast with, "I am an oil tanker, Dickie Arbiter is on fire in the Gulf." This would then go on to be immortalised by Fi Glover as the title of her book I am an Oil Tanker: Travels with My Radio.

Upon his return to the United Kingdom, he was a special events presenter for LBC and court correspondent for Independent Radio News

His television appearances include Newsnight, BBC Breakfast, BBC News, This Morning, Larry King Live and Richard and Judy.

In March 2021, he was tricked by a fictional news company created by YouTuber pranksters Josh Pieters and Archie Manners into giving his purported reaction to the Oprah with Meghan and Harry interview two days before the interview was aired.

Personal life

He is the father of Victoria Arbiter, who is a commentator on the Royal Family.

Publication

His book On Duty with the Queen: My Twelve Years as a Buckingham Palace Press Secretary was published in October 2014.

References

External links
Dickie Arbiter Website

1940 births
British male journalists
Living people
British memoirists
Members of the British Royal Household
LBC radio presenters
Lieutenants of the Royal Victorian Order